Operation Pyravlos  ("Rocket") was a military campaign of the Greek Civil War launched by the National Army of the Athens-based internationally recognized government, under General Alexander Papagos. All communist forces in central Greece were defeated and the only areas that remained under communist control were in the Grammos and Vitsi mountains.

1949 in Greece
Conflicts in 1949
Pyravlos
History of Central Greece